Sony Digital Audio Disc Corporation (Sony DADC) is a manufacturer of CDs, DVDs, UMDs, and Blu-ray Discs. The company has many plants worldwide. Although it primarily services Sony Music Entertainment-owned record labels, Sony Pictures Home Entertainment, and Sony Interactive Entertainment, it also manufactures discs for other labels, home entertainment distributors, and video game publishers.

Sony DADC's first plant, in Terre Haute, Indiana, opened May 2, 1983, and produced its first CD, Bruce Springsteen's Born in the U.S.A., in September 1984. It was the first CD manufacturer in the United States, is the company's principal CD manufacturing facility, and is the company's research and development center.

The plant was initially a subsidiary of CBS/Sony Group, but Sony bought out CBS's stake in October 1985.

When Sony bought CBS Records in 1988, it acquired that company's manufacturing facilities, some of which later became part of Sony DADC. Among these are the plants in Pitman, New Jersey (closed in 2011) Terre Haute, Indiana; Toronto, Ontario, Canada (plant closed in 2011); Mexico City (plant closed 2015); Salzburg, Austria; Mumbai, India; and Manaus, Brazil—all of which were originally manufacturers of vinyl gramophone records. These plants began manufacturing CDs later: Pitman in 1988, Manaus in 1992, and Toronto and Mexico City in 1994.

LaserDiscs, primarily 12-inch disc prints of feature films and concerts, were manufactured by Sony DADC in the 1980s and 1990s. Some of the laserdiscs made at DADC currently show laser rot, more than those from any other manufacturer.

Sony DADC now manufactures the majority of CDs sold in the United States. In November 2008, the company bought the American disc-manufacturing capabilities of Glenayre Technologies, which manufactured the discs of Universal Music Group. In the summer of 2009, the company assumed the physical distribution of EMI's North American operations. This left WEA as the only major label whose discs are not manufactured by the company, as its discs are manufactured by the operations of the former WEA Manufacturing that were sold to Cinram.

On August 8, 2011, a Sony DADC distribution center in Enfield was destroyed during the 2011 England riots. The warehouse was used by independent music distributor PIAS Entertainment Group to distribute CDs, LPs, and DVDs for over 100 European independent labels. The total stock loss in the fire was reported to be between 3.5 million and 25 million units.

On January 17, 2018, the DADC plant in Terre Haute, Indiana, announced that they would be laying off 375 employees, and shifting manufacturing of audio discs to another manufacturer, Sonopress. It was later determined that manufacturing of most audio discs would be facilitated by CDA Inc. The majority of audio discs manufactured for Universal Music Group US and Sony Music Entertainment US are presently manufactured by CDA Inc, while the discs are packaged and assembled into jewel cases in the USA. Technicolor sometimes also assists in the facilitation of disc manufacturing for Universal Music Group US.

On January 13, 2022, the DADC plant in Terre Haute, Indiana, announced that they would be laying off 100 employees, and shifting gaming and disc manufacturing capacity out of Terre Haute to Salzburg, Austria. Assembly and distribution will remain in Terre Haute, Indiana.

Sony DADC Plants

Manufacturing codes

Printed on the discs or packaging of Sony DADC-manufactured CDs are codes indicating master copies (matrix numbers) of discs. These codes begin with a 4-letter prefix followed by a series of digits. Common prefixes include the following:
 DIDC – Classical recordings released on Sony-affiliated record labels.
 DIDP – Popular (i.e., non-classical) recordings released on Sony-affiliated record labels.
 DIDX – Recordings pressed by DADC for release on non-Sony-affiliated record labels.
 DIDY – Recordings pressed by the US division of DADC for the Columbia House Record Club.
 DIDZ – Recordings released on WEA Japan. (This code was only used from 1983 to 1985.)
 CDRM - CD-ROM titles
 LDVS - Standard Laserdiscs
 LDTA - THX & AC-3 Laserdiscs
 LDTX - THX Laserdiscs
 LDAC - AC-3 Laserdiscs
 DVSS - Single-layer DVDs
 DVDL - Dual-layer DVDs
 DDLD - "CD" side of DualDiscs
 DDHD - DVD side of DualDiscs
 AULD - "CD" side of DualDiscs containing DVD-Audio
 AUHD - DVD side of DualDiscs containing DVD-Audio
 SUSS - Single-layer Super Audio CDs
 SUDL - Dual-layer Super Audio CDs
 STLD or SULD - CD layer of hybrid Super Audio CDs
 SUHD - Super Audio CD layer of hybrid Super Audio CDs
 BVSS - Single-layer Blu-ray Discs
 BVDL - Dual-layer Blu-ray Discs
 BHSS - Single-layer Hybrid Blu-ray Discs (discs containing both Blu-ray video and PlayStation 3 format software)
 BHDL - Dual-layer Hybrid Blu-ray Discs (discs containing both Blu-ray video and PlayStation 3 format software)
 USDL - Dual-layer Ultra HD Blu-ray Discs
 USTL - Triple-layer Ultra HD Blu-ray discs
 DRSS - DVD-ROM software titles
 PSRM - PlayStation titles
 PTRM - PlayStation 2 CD-ROM titles
 PDSS - PlayStation 2 DVD-ROM titles
 PDDL - PlayStation 2 DVD-ROM Dual-layer titles
 UPSS - PlayStation Portable UMD Single-layer titles
 UPDL - PlayStation Portable UMD Dual-layer titles
 BPSS - PlayStation 3 Blu-ray Disc Single-layer titles
 BPDL - PlayStation 3 Blu-ray Disc Dual-layer titles
 B4SS - PlayStation 4 Blu-ray Disc Single-layer titles
 B4DL - PlayStation 4 Blu-ray Disc Dual-layer titles
 P5DL - PlayStation 5 Blu-ray Disc Dual-layer titles
 P5TL - PlayStation 5 Blu-ray Disc Triple-layer titles

See also
 WEA Manufacturing

References

External links
 Official Sony DADC−Digital Audio Disc Corporation website

1983 establishments in Japan
Compact disc
Electronics companies established in 1983
Electronics companies of Japan
Manufacturing companies based in Indiana
Manufacturing companies of Japan
Digital Audio Disc Corporation